The Dunning School was a historiographical school of thought regarding the Reconstruction period of American history (1865–1877), supporting conservative elements against the Radical Republicans who introduced civil rights in the South. It was named for Columbia University professor William Archibald Dunning, who taught many of its followers.

Profile
The Dunning School viewpoint favored conservative elements in the South (the Redeemers, plantation owners and former Confederates) and disparaged Radical Republicans who favored civil rights for former slaves. The views of the Dunning School dominated scholarly and popular depictions of the era from about 1900 to the 1930s. Adam Fairclough, a British historian whose expertise includes Reconstruction, summarized the Dunningite themes:

Historian Eric Foner, a leading specialist, said:

History
The school was named after Columbia University professor William Archibald Dunning (1857–1922), whose writings and those of his PhD students comprised the main elements of the school.  He supported the idea that the South had been hurt by Reconstruction and that American values had been trampled by the use of the U.S. Army to control state politics.  He contended that freedmen had proved incapable of self-government and thus had made segregation necessary. Dunning believed that allowing blacks to vote and hold office had been "a serious error".  As a professor, he taught generations of scholars, many of whom expanded his views of the evils of Reconstruction.  The Dunning School and similar historians dominated the version of Reconstruction-era history in textbooks into the 1960s.  Their generalized adoption of deprecatory terms such as scalawags for southern white Republicans and carpetbaggers for northerners who worked and settled in the South, have persisted in historical works.

Explaining the success of the Dunning School, historian Peter Novick noted two forces—the need to reconcile the North and the South after the Civil War and the increase in racism as Social Darwinism appeared to back the concept with science—that contributed to a "racist historiographical consensus" around the turn of the 20th century on the "criminal outrages" of Reconstruction. Novick provided examples of the style of the Dunning School approach when he wrote:

Even James Wilford Garner's Reconstruction in Mississippi, regarded by W. E. B. Du Bois as the fairest work of the Dunning school, depicted Reconstruction as "unwise" and Black politicians as liabilities to Southern administrations.

In the 1940s Howard K. Beale began to define a different approach.  Beale's analysis combined an assumption of "racial egalitarianism and an insistence on the centrality of class".  He claimed that some of the more progressive southern historians continued to propose "that their race must bar Negroes from social and economic equality."  Beale indicated other southern historians' making more positive contributions were "southern liberals" such as C. Vann Woodward and Francis Simkins.

Coulter
While he did not study with Dunning or at Columbia University, the Southern historian E. Merton Coulter represented some typical views. According to the New Georgia Encyclopedia, he "framed his literary corpus to praise the Old South, glorify Confederate heroes, vilify northerners, and denigrate southern blacks." He taught at the University of Georgia for sixty years, founded the Southern Historical Association, and edited the Georgia Historical Quarterly for fifty years, so he had many avenues of influence.  Historian John Hope Franklin wrote of Coulter:

Eric Foner wrote in 1988:

Criticism of the Dunning School

The Dunning School was criticized by John R. Lynch in his 1913 book The Facts of Reconstruction, in which he argued that African American politicians had made many gains since the end of the civil war and that those gains were of their own accord.

In 1935, W. E. B. DuBois attacked the premises of the Dunning School in Black Reconstruction, setting forth ideas such as the active agency of blacks in the era, that the struggle over control of black labor was central to the politics of the era, and that Reconstruction was a time of great promise and many accomplishments, the overthrow of which was a tragic defeat for democracy. While the work was largely ignored by historians at the time, later revisionist scholars lauded DuBois's analysis.

Historian Kenneth M. Stampp was one of the leaders of the revisionist movement regarding reconstruction, which mounted a successful attack on Dunning's racially biased narrative. In putting his criticism  in proper context, Stampp wrote:

Stampp then noted that "Dunningites overlooked a great deal",  and revisionists rejected "the two-dimensional characters that Dunning's disciples have painted."  Stampp asserted that even in accurately identifying the corruption of many state reconstruction governments, the Dunning School fell short.  It engaged in "distortion by exaggeration, by a lack of perspective, by superficial analysis, and by overemphasis," while ignoring "constructive accomplishments" and failing to acknowledge "men who transcended the greed" of the age.

Historian Jean Edward Smith wrote that the Dunning School "despite every intention to be fair" wrote from a white supremacist perspective.  Smith stated, "Blacks were depicted as inherently incapable of meaningful political participation while terrorist organizations such as the Ku Klux Klan were applauded for their efforts to restore the South's natural order."  Referring to "the racist rants of the Dunning school", Smith noted that the influence of the Civil Rights Movement of the 1950s and 1960s "consigned the Dunning school to the museum of historical artifacts."

Writing in 2005, the influential Reconstruction historian Eric Foner analyzed the Dunning School as follows:

Philip R. Muller, while acknowledging the widespread charges of racism against Dunning personally, laid much of the perception on Dunning's "methodological weakness" in one particular work, Reconstruction, Political and Economic 1865-1877.  Muller noted that "faulty ... generalizations" abounded.

Some historians have suggested that historians sympathetic to the Neo-Confederate movement are influenced by the Dunning School's interpretation of history.

Dunning School scholars
 Claude Bowers, The Tragic Era (1929), best-selling popular history by an Indiana writer
 William Watson Davis, The Civil War and Reconstruction in Florida (1913).
 J. G. de Roulhac Hamilton, Reconstruction in North Carolina (1914).
 Walter Lynwood Fleming, Civil War and Reconstruction in Alabama (1905).
 James Wilford Garner, Reconstruction in Mississippi (1901).
 Charles W. Ramsdell, Reconstruction in Texas (1910).
 John Schreiner Reynolds, Reconstruction in South Carolina, 1865–1877 (1905).
 Thomas Staples, Reconstruction in Arkansas, 1862–1874 (1923).
 C. Mildred Thompson, Reconstruction in Georgia (1915).
 E. Merton Coulter, The South During Reconstruction (1947).

References
Notes

Bibliography

 Blight, David. Race and Reunion: The Civil War in American Memory (2000).
 Current, Richard N. "From Civil War to World Power" in Legacy of Disunion: The Enduring Significance of the Civil War." editors Susan-Mary Grant and Peter J. Parrish. (2003)
 Fairclough, Adam. "Was the Grant of Black Suffrage a Political Error? Reconsidering the Views of John W. Burgess, William A. Dunning, and Eric Foner on Congressional Reconstruction," Journal of The Historical Society (June 2012)  12: 155–188. doi: 10.1111/j.1540-5923.2012.00361.x   A favorable view of the School
Ross, Michael and Rowland, Leslie, "Adam Fairclough, John Burgess, and the Nettlesome Legacy of the 'Dunning School'," Journal of The Historical Society vol. 12, No. 3 (September 2012), 249–270.
 Foner, Eric. Reconstruction: America's Unfinished Revolution 1863-1877. (1988)
 Foner, Eric. Forever Free.(2005)
 Muller, Philip R. "Look Back Without Anger: A Reappraisal of William A. Dunning". Journal of American History 1974 61(2): 325–338. Online at JSTOR at most colleges.
 Novick, Peter. That Noble Dream: The "Objectivity Question" and the American Historical Profession. (1988)
 Smith, John David. Slavery, Race and American History: Historical Conflict, Trends, and Methods, 1866–1953 (1999) excerpt
 Smith, John David and J. Vincent Lowery, eds. The Dunning School: Historians, Race, and the Meaning of Reconstruction  (University Press of Kentucky; 2013) 336 pages; scholarly essays on the leading scholars
 Stampp, Kenneth M. The Era of Reconstruction 1865-1877. (1965)
 Weisberger, Bernard A. "The Dark and Bloody Ground of Reconstruction Historiography," Journal of Southern History Vol. 25, No. 4 (Nov., 1959), pp. 427–447 in JSTOR
 Williams, T. Harry. "An Analysis of Some Reconstruction Attitudes," Journal of Southern History Vol. 12, No. 4 (Nov., 1946), pp. 469–486 in JSTOR

Primary sources (by Dunning School members)
 Dunning, William Archibald. Reconstruction: Political & Economic, 1865–1877 (1905).
  "The Undoing of Reconstruction," by William A. Dunning, The Atlantic (October 1901)
 The Sequel of Appomattox, A Chronicle of the Reunion of the States by Walter Lynwood Fleming, (1918) full text of short overview.
 Fleming, Walter L. ed. Documentary History of Reconstruction: Political, Military, Social, Religious, Educational, and Industrial'' (1906).

External links
Full list of Dunning's works - including Reconstruction - available from Google
E. Merton Coulter, Civil War and Readjustment in Kentucky (1926) 

Anti-black racism in the United States
Columbia University
Historical schools
Historiography of the American Civil War
History of African-American civil rights
History of the Southern United States
Lost Cause of the Confederacy
Pseudohistory
Reconstruction Era